USS Lilian was a large steamer captured by the Union Navy during the American Civil War. She was used by the Navy to patrol navigable waterways of the Confederacy to prevent the South from trading with other countries.

Captured by the Union and commissioned as a Union Navy vessel 

Among the prisoners were five Wilmington, North Carolina, pilots being carried to Bermuda to guide Confederate ships through the blockade. Purchased by the Navy from the Philadelphia, Pennsylvania, Prize Court 6 September 1864, she was commissioned 6 October at the Philadelphia Navy Yard, Acting Volunteer Lt. T. A. Harris in command.

Assigned to join the Union fleet attacking Fort Fisher 

Lilian joined the fleet attacking Fort Fisher, Cape Fear River, 23 to 24 December 1864 and 13 to 14 January 1865. She landed troops above the fort on the 13th, and then bombarded it. After this attack, she patrolled the inlet, and with  captured the British steamer Blenheim 25 January.

Post-war decommissioning, sale, and civilian career 

She decommissioned 5 April 1865 and was sold at public auction at New York City 30 November 1865. Documented 8 October 1866, Lilian operated in merchant service until 1868.

References 

Ships of the Union Navy
Steamships of the United States Navy
Ships built on the River Clyde
Gunboats of the United States Navy
1863 ships